Tejaswin Shankar (born 21 December 1998) is an Indian athlete who competes in the high jump event. He holds the high jump national record of 2.29 metres set in April 2018.

Early and personal life
Shankar was born on 21 December 1998 in Delhi into a Tamil family. He hails from Saket in South Delhi. He studied at the Sardar Patel Vidyalaya in New Delhi, where he played cricket until eighth grade before his physical education teacher suggested he switch to high jump. He soon started winning medals at inter-school athletics meets. His father Harishankar, a lawyer, died of blood cancer in 2014.

Shankar received a four-year athletics scholarship to the Kansas State University in 2017 where he studied business administration. In what is perceived as an unconventional career choice for an active athlete, he has a corporate career in the US, where he works for Deloitte.

Career
Shankar won the gold medal at the 2015 Commonwealth Youth Games in Apia, setting a Games record of 2.14 metres. He won silver at the 2016 South Asian Games in Guwahati with a leap of 2.17 metres. Due to a groin injury, he finished sixth at the Asian Junior Championships and missed the 2016 World Junior Championships.

At the age of 17, Shankar rose to prominence when he broke Hari Shankar Roy's 12-year-old national record of 2.25 metres with a jump of 2.26 metres at the Junior National Championships in Coimbatore in November 2016. He was the third best IAAF junior high jumper in the world that year. He was bedridden for six months in 2017 with a slipped disc.

In January 2018, Shankar broke Roy's indoor national record with a mark of 2.18 metres, and then bettered it by a centimetre the same month. In February, he further improved on his indoor record with a 2.28 metres leap at the Big 12 Indoor Athletics Championships in Ames.

Shankar finished sixth at the 2018 Commonwealth Games during qualification for the games Shankar bettered his own national record by jumping 2.28 metres at the 22nd Federation Cup Indian Championships in Patiala in March 2018. It was the joint-best performance to qualify for the Commonwealth Games. He further broke his national record by another centimeter representing K-State athletics, jumping 2.29m in April 2018 at the Texas tech invite.

Shankar, who was not initially selected in the 2022 Commonwealth Games contingent despite meeting the qualification standard, took the Athletics Federation of India to court and was later brought in as a replacement. He secured the bronze medal at the event in Birmingham with a jump of 2.22 metres; this was India's first ever high jump medal at the Commonwealth Games.

References

External links

1998 births
Living people
Athletes from Delhi
Indian male high jumpers
Kansas State University alumni
Athletes (track and field) at the 2018 Commonwealth Games
Athletes (track and field) at the 2022 Commonwealth Games
Commonwealth Games bronze medallists for India
Commonwealth Games medallists in athletics
Kansas State Wildcats men's track and field athletes
South Asian Games silver medalists for India
South Asian Games medalists in athletics
Medallists at the 2022 Commonwealth Games